The 2005 World Senior Curling Championships were held from March 19 to 25 at the Greenacres Curling Club in Howwood, Scotland.

Group A of each gender consisted of the best ranked countries from the previous year. The three best teams of the A-groups advanced to the semi finals as well as the winner of the B-groups. The top ranked team in A played against the top ranked team in B, the winner went on to the gold medal game and the loser went on to the bronze medal game. The 2nd place team in A played against the 3rd place team in A, and the winner went on to the gold medal game and the loser went on to the bronze medal game.

Men

Teams

Round robin

Group A

Group B

  Teams to playoffs
  Teams to tiebreaker

Tiebreaker

Playoffs

Semi-finals
March 25, 19:00

Bronze medal game
March 26, 9:30

Final
March 26, 14:00

Final standings

Women

Teams

Round robin

Group A

Group B

  Teams to playoffs
  Teams to tiebreaker

Tiebreaker
March 25, 8:30

25 марта, 12:30

Playoffs

Semi-finalsMarch 25, 19:00

Bronze medal gameMarch 26, 9:30

FinalMarch 26, 19:00

Final standings

References

External links

World Senior Curling Championships
2005 in curling
2005 in Scottish sport
International curling competitions hosted by Scotland
Sport in Renfrewshire
March 2005 sports events in the United Kingdom